The 1955 Abilene Christian Wildcats football team represented Abilene Christian College—now known as Abilene Christian University—as a member of the Gulf Coast Conference (GCC) during the 1955 college football season. Led by Garvin Beauchamp in his sixth and final season as head coach, the Wildcats compiled an overall record of 3–5–2 with a mark of 2–1 in conference play, sharing the GCC title with North Texas State. Abilene Christian's game against Mississippi Southern on November 5 counted in the conference standings even though Mississippi Southern was not a member of the GCC.

Schedule

References

Abilene Christian
Abilene Christian Wildcats football seasons
Abilene Christian Wildcats football